The name Sibir can refer to:

 Russian for Siberia
 the Khanate of Sibir, after which the region of Siberia is named
 Qashliq, also known as Sibir, historical capital city of Khanate of Sibir
 S7 Airlines, a Russian  airline based in Novosibirsk, Russia, formerly known as Sibir Airlines
 FC Sibir Novosibirsk, an association football club based in Novosibirsk, Russia
 HC Sibir, ice hockey club based in Novosibirsk, Russia
 Sibir Energy, a Russian company listed on the London Stock Exchange

Icebreakers 
 Sibir (1937 icebreaker), a Soviet icebreaker launched in 1937 as I. Stalin and later renamed
 Sibir (1977 icebreaker), a Soviet Arktika-class nuclear-powered icebreaker in service from 1977 until 1992
 Sibir (2017 icebreaker), a Russian Project 22220 icebreaker expected to enter service in 2020